Grasim Bhiwani Textiles was a subsidiary of Grasim Industries, but has now been taken over by the promoters of the Donear Group.

Brands
 Grasim
 Graviera

References

Textile companies of India
Companies based in Haryana
Aditya Birla Group
Manufacturing companies established in 2007
2007 establishments in Haryana